"Fame and Fortune" is a song by English rock band Bad Company. The song was released as the third and final single from the album of the same name. The track was written by guitarist Mick Ralphs.

"Fame and Fortune" peaked at #37 on the Billboard Mainstream Rock chart, the band's second lowest peak position on the chart.

Track listing

Personnel
 Brian Howe – vocals
 Mick Ralphs – guitar
 Steve Price – bass
 Simon Kirke – drums

References

Bad Company songs
1986 songs
1986 singles
Atlantic Records singles
Songs written by Mick Ralphs